Robert Dee Countryman (October 17, 1895 – November 6, 1964) was an American minor league baseball player and manager and college baseball head coach.

Countryman played in the minor leagues in 1914, from 1916-20 and from 1925-26 for the San Antonio Bronchos (1914), Fort Worth Panthers (1917), Houston Buffaloes (1918), Greenville Spinners (1919–1920), Galveston Pirates (1919), Mount Pleasant Cats (1925) and Palestine Pals (1926). He managed the Cats in 1925 and the Pals in 1926, replacing Jack Stansbury in the latter campaign. He served in World War I.

Countryman was head coach of the Rice Owls baseball team in 1922 and 1923 and the Texas A&M Aggies baseball team in 1928 and 1929. He had a career college coaching record of 28–31–3.

References

1895 births
1964 deaths
Baseball outfielders
Minor league baseball players
Minor league baseball managers
Rice Owls baseball coaches
Texas A&M Aggies baseball coaches
People from Navasota, Texas